Abul Kashem is a Bangladesh Nationalist Party politician and the former Member of Parliament of Dhaka-16.

Career
Kashem was a sub-sector commander of the Mukti Bahini during Bangladesh Liberation War in 1971.

Kashem was elected to parliament from Dhaka-16 as a Bangladesh Nationalist Party candidate in 1979. He served as the Minister of Youth Development in the cabinet of President Abdus Sattar.

Death 
Kashem died on 18 July 2018 and was buried in Comilla Adarsha Sadar Upazila in his family graveyard.

References

20th-century births
2018 deaths
Bangladesh Nationalist Party politicians
2nd Jatiya Sangsad members
Year of birth missing
Mukti Bahini personnel
People from Comilla District